Ministry of Home Affairs Nepal is the governmental body of Nepal mainly responsible for delivering critical services to the citizens and maintain security in the nation. After the Supreme Court annulled Rabi Lamichhane's citizenship certificate, the incumbent prime minister Pushpa Kamal Dahal is serving as the current minister of home affairs.

Introduction
After the political changes in Nepal in 2007, B.S. The Ministry of Home Affairs was established in 2008 B.S. After the change in 2017, the name of the Ministry of Home Affairs was changed to the Ministry of Home Panchayat and Nepal was divided into 14 zones and 75 districts with the arrangement of Zonal Governor and Chief District Officer. After the commencement of the Local Administration Act, 2028 BS, the duties and rights of the zonal magistrates and PGAs were legally regulated. After the formation of the Ministry of Local Development in 2037 BS, the main task of the Ministry of Home Affairs was to maintain law and order and local administration. As per the Constitution of Nepal 2072 BS, 77 districts have been established and there are 77 district administration offices under the Ministry.
Maintaining peace, order and security in the country and protecting the livelihood and freedom of the people is the main objective of the Home Administration. In order to make the Home Administration strong and capable, to give a sense of security to the people and to make the service flow effective and maintain good governance.
The basic objective of the Ministry of Home Affairs is to protect the lives, property and freedom of the people by maintaining peace, order and security.

Organisational structure
The Ministry of Home consists of the following seven Departments:
 District Administration Office 
 Immigration Department
 Prison Management Department
 Police Record Management Department
 National ID and Registration Department
 Armed Police Force
 Nepal Police

List of Ministers of Home Affairs

References

Home Affairs